β-Hydroxy β-methylbutyryl-coenzyme A (HMB-CoA), also known as 3-hydroxyisovaleryl-CoA, is a metabolite of -leucine that is produced in the human body. Its immediate precursors are β-hydroxy β-methylbutyric acid (HMB) and β-methylcrotonoyl-CoA (MC-CoA).  It can be metabolized into HMB, MC-CoA, and HMG-CoA in humans.

Metabolic pathway

Notes

References

Biomolecules
Metabolism
Thioesters of coenzyme A